Rostanga pulchra is a species of sea slug, a dorid nudibranch, a shell-less marine gastropod mollusk in the family Discodorididae.

Distribution
This is a well known species which has been reported on the Pacific Ocean coast of North, Central and South America from Point Craven, Alaska to the Gulf of California, Panama, Chile and Argentina.

Description
Size up to 30 mm in length.

Habitat
Found intertidally under boulders and in shallow water, normally feeding on the sponge Ophlitaspongia pennata.

References

Discodorididae
Gastropods described in 1905